Kushki may refer to:

Kushki, Dowreh, Lorestan Province
Kushki, Pol-e Dokhtar, Lorestan Province
Kushki Do, Khuzestan Province
Kushki-ye Olya
Kushki-ye Sofla
Seyyed Karim-e Kushki
Kushki, North Khorasan
Kushki Kikanlu, North Khorasan Province
Kushki Raji, North Khorasan Province
Kushki Torkaman, North Khorasan Province
Kushki, a cheetah

See also
Gushki (disambiguation)